Argyroploce is a genus of moths belonging to the subfamily Olethreutinae of the family Tortricidae.

Species
Argyroploce aquilonana Karvonen, 1932
Argyroploce arbutella (Linnaeus, 1758)
Argyroploce dalecarliana (Guenée, 1845)
Argyroploce lediana (Linnaeus, 1758)
Argyroploce noricana (Herrich-Schffer, 1851)
Argyroploce roseomaculana ([Denis & Schiffermüller], 1775)
Argyroploce unedana Baixeras, 2002

See also
List of Tortricidae genera

References

External links
Tortricid.net

Olethreutini
Tortricidae genera
Taxa named by Jacob Hübner